Salvador José "Chico" Hernández Ramos (January 3, 1916 – January 3, 1986) was a Major League Baseball catcher.

Along with Hi Bithorn, Chico became the third latino battery mates in ML history . Preceded by Tuero/Gonzalez (Cards) in 1918, and Luque/Cueto (Reds), also in 1918 . Retrosheet / Games / Season 1918 .

Notes

External links

Chico Hernandez - Pantagraph (Bloomington, IL newspaper)

Major League Baseball catchers
Chicago Cubs players
Milwaukee Brewers (minor league) players
Montgomery Bombers players
Bloomington Bloomers players
Los Angeles Angels (minor league) players
Tulsa Oilers (baseball) players
Baltimore Orioles (IL) players
Major League Baseball players from Cuba
Cuban expatriate baseball players in the United States
1916 births
1986 deaths